Soul Driver may refer to:

Soul Driver, a 2000 album by Julie Christensen
"Soul Driver", a song by Bruce Springsteen on his 1992 album Human Touch
"Soul Driver", a song by Ocean Colour Scene on their 1999 album One from the Modern